Felipe Nerio Espinosa (-1863) was a notorious Mexican-American murderer who killed an estimated thirty-two people in the Colorado Territory throughout the spring and fall of 1863.

Early life
Felipe Nerio Espinosa was probably born in what is today El Rito Unincorporated Community,   
Rio Arriba County, New Mexico Territory (at that time, Santa Fe de Nuevo México) although some sources cite his place of birth as Veracruz, Mexico. His parents were Pedro Ignacio Espinosa, who was born in Abiquiu, New Mexico, and Gertrudis Chavez. He had a brother named Vivian.

The Mexican census of 1845 from El Rito, New Mexico lists several members of the Espinosa family, while the 1860 US Census lists a Felipe Nerio Espinosa living in Conejos, San Fernando Valley, Taos, New Mexico with his wife and two children, a girl of five and a son of two.

Killing spree
There is no definitive reason as to why the Espinosa brothers began their rampage but evidence suggests it was because the US Army had been tasked with arresting the pair over alleged robberies in the area. When the two men did not give themselves up, one of their homes was burned and their property confiscated. The pair had ended up in American territory after the signing of the Treaty of Guadalupe Hidalgo in February 1848. It had ceded the area and its Hispanic settlers to the United States following the conclusion of Mexican–American War (1846–1848). In the decade that had followed the treaty, many Hispanic people had lost title to their lands because territory courts showed an inclination to settle land disputes in favor of White settlers.

Aided by his brother Vivian, Espinosa began his murder spree in the thinly populated area of what is now Fremont County, Colorado. "The brothers' first victim was found in May 1863, his corpse mutilated and the heart hacked out of his chest. During that summer, twenty-five more people were attacked and killed in similar fashion."

Lawmen, including Conejos County Sheriff Emmett Harding and 1st Colorado Volunteer Infantry Unit Commander S. B. Tappan, were dispatched to find Espinosa, but they met with little success. A posse out of Park County, Colorado finally managed to track the brothers southwest of Canon City, Colorado. Vivian was shot and killed in the ensuing gunfight but Felipe escaped. After hiding out for the remainder of the summer, Felipe recruited a fourteen-year-old nephew named Jose and resumed the rampage. Soon after, legendary tracker Tom Tobin was enlisted by the US Army find the pair. In a matter of days, Tobin found the outlaws' camp and in a brief gunfight shot and killed both Espinosas. He took their heads back to Fort Garland, Colorado.

In popular culture
The Felipe Espinosa story is the foundation for Adam James Jones's book, The Vendetta of Felipe Espinosa (2014).

See also 
 List of serial killers in the United States

References

External links
 
 The Untold Truth of Outlaw Felipe Espinosa. Grunge.com. 20 January 2022.
 Felipe Espinoza: One Of America's First Serial Killers. Serialkillercalendar.com.

1820s births
1863 deaths
American people of Mexican descent
American serial killers
Deaths by firearm in Colorado
Fugitives
Latino people shot dead by law enforcement officers in the United States
Male serial killers
People from El Rito, Rio Arriba County, New Mexico
Racially motivated violence against European Americans